Drusilla Norman Beyfus (born 1927) is a British etiquette writer. She was married to the journalist and critic Milton Shulman.

Publications (selected)
1968: The English Marriage: what it is like to be married today
1969: Lady Behave: a guide to modern manners for the 1970s (with Anne Edwards) 
1985: The Bride's Book
1992: Courtship - The Done Thing: modern manners in miniature 
1992: Modern Manners: the essential guide to living in the '90s
1992: Parties - The Done Thing: modern manners in miniature 
1993: Business: the Done Thing
1993: Sex: the Done Thing
1994: Modern Manners: the complete guide to contemporary etiquette

References

1927 births
Living people
People from Hampstead
Etiquette writers
English Jewish writers